Felice "Lizzie" Rix-Ueno (1893–1967) was an Austrian textile, wallpaper, and craft designer. She lived in Japan, and became an influential figure in the Japanese modern art scene.

Early life and education

Felice Rix was born in Vienna. She studied at University of Applied Arts Vienna and Josef Hoffmann was her teacher.

Career

She worked at Wiener Werkstätte. There, she designed wallpaper and textiles. She married Japanese architect Isaburo Ueno in 1925, who worked at Hoffmann's architecture firm. They moved to Japan. She would teach at the Kyoto City University of Arts after World War II.

Legacy

Her work is in held in the collection of the Cooper Hewitt, Smithsonian Design Museum, Metropolitan Museum of Art, Art Institute of Chicago, Los Angeles County Museum of Art, and the National Museum of Modern Art, Kyoto. The National Museum of Modern Art describes her work as "demonstrating the fusion of sensibilities of Vienna and Kyoto."

References

1893 births
1967 deaths
Austrian artists
Textile artists
Artists from Vienna
Artists from Kyoto
University of Applied Arts Vienna alumni
Women textile artists
Austrian expatriates in Japan